Moments (translit. Rega'im) is a 1979 French-Israeli drama art film written, directed by and starring Michal Bat-Adam. The film was selected as the Israeli entry for the Best Foreign Language Film at the 52nd Academy Awards, but was not accepted as a nominee.  It also competed in the Un Certain Regard section at the 1979 Cannes Film Festival.

Cast
 Michal Bat-Adam as Yola
 Dahn Ben Amotz as Architect
 Brigitte Catillon as Anne
 Assi Dayan as Avi
 Eliram Dekel as Roni
 Goldie Heller as Taxi Passenger
 Elisabeth Klein as American Tourist
 Yehoshua Luff as Hotel Waiter
 Rose Meshihi as Maid
 Tova Piron as Restaurant Server

See also
 List of submissions to the 52nd Academy Awards for Best Foreign Language Film
 List of Israeli submissions for the Academy Award for Best Foreign Language Film

References

External links
 

1979 films
1979 drama films
1970s female buddy films
1979 LGBT-related films
French drama films
French female buddy films
1970s French-language films
1970s Hebrew-language films
Israeli drama films
Israeli LGBT-related films
Lesbian-related films
Films directed by Michal Bat-Adam
1979 multilingual films
French multilingual films
Israeli multilingual films
1970s French films